Paget's disease of the breast is a type of cancer that outwardly may have the appearance of eczema, with skin changes involving the nipple of the breast. The condition is an uncommon disease accounting for 1 to 4.3% of all breast cancers and was first described by Sir James Paget in 1874.

The condition in itself often appears innocuous, limited to a surface appearance and it is sometimes dismissed, although actually indicative of underlying breast cancer. Immunohistochemistry of Paget cells and underlying breast cancer show a more aggressive, HER2-enriched, molecular subtype of breast cancer.

Signs and symptoms
Paget's disease of the breast can affect the nipple and areola. Symptoms typically only affect one breast. Symptoms may include:
 Skin. The first symptom is usually an eczema-like rash. The skin of the nipple and areola may be red, itchy and inflamed. After a period of time, the skin may become flaky or scaly.
 Discharge. A discharge, which may be straw-colored or bloody, may ooze from the area.
 Sensation. Some women have a burning sensation.  These symptoms usually occur in more advanced stages, when serious destruction of the skin often prompts the patient to consult. Lumps or masses in the breast occur in 50% of the patients. In more advanced stages, the disease may cause tingling, increased sensitivity and pain.
 Nipple changes. The nipple may become inverted.
 Breast changes. There may or may not be a lump in the breast, and there may be redness, oozing and crusting, and a sore that does not heal.

The symptoms usually affect the nipple and then spread to the areola and then the breast. It is common for the symptoms to wax and wane.

Most women do not visit the doctor because they assume Paget's disease to be minor contact dermatitis or eczema. A lump or skin irritation that does not seem to heal for over a month indicates that attention by a specialist is needed.

Pathophysiology
Paget's disease of the breast is characterised by Paget cells. Paget cells are large cells with clear cytoplasm (clear halo) and eccentric, hyperchromic nuclei found throughout the epidermis.

There is some controversy as to whether these cells arise from the ductal system of the breast, or whether these cells are a result of in situ malignant transformation.

According to the migratory theory, ductal carcinoma in situ cells migrate into the lactiferous sinuses and the nipple skin. Cancer cells disrupt the normal epithelial barrier and extracellular fluid accumulates on the surface of the skin, resulting in the crusting of the areola skin.

Diagnosis

Recommended tests are a mammogram and a biopsy to confirm the diagnosis, and cytopathology may also be helpful. Paget's disease is difficult to diagnose due to its resemblance to dermatitis and eczema; even in patients after ductal carcinoma in situ surgery. Eczema tends to affect the areola first, and then the nipple, whereas Paget's spreads from the nipple.

During a physical examination, the doctor examines the unusual areas of the breast, especially the appearance of the skin on and around the nipples and feeling for any lumps or areas of thickening.

The most common test used to diagnose Paget's disease is the biopsy, removal of a tissue sample from the affected area which is then examined under the microscope by a pathologist, who distinguishes Paget cells from other cell types by staining tissues to identify specific cells (immunohistochemistry). CD138 and p53 can be used, both being positive in Paget's disease, and negative in Toker cells, which are normal epithelial cells with clear cytoplasm that can be difficult to distinguish from Paget's disease. Besides, Paget cells stain positive for CK7 in >90% of the cases. Similarly, GATA3 and HER-2 are expressed in around 90% of the cases, and can be used for the confirmation, including CK7 negative Paget disease.

Samples of nipple discharge may also be examined under the microscope to determine whether Paget cells are present.

Imprint or scrape cytopathology may be useful: scraping cells from the affected area, or pressing them onto a glass slide to be examined under the microscope.

On average, a woman may experience signs and symptoms for six to eight months before a diagnosis is made.

Treatment 
Paget's disease of the breast is a type of cancer of the breast.  Treatment usually involves a lumpectomy or mastectomy to surgically remove the tumour. Chemotherapy and/or radiotherapy may be necessary, but the specific treatment often depends on the characteristics of the underlying breast cancer.

Invasive cancer or extensive ductal carcinoma in situ is primarily treated with modified radical mastectomies. The procedure consists in the removal of the breast, the lining over the chest muscles and a part of the lymph nodes from under the arm. In cases of noninvasive cancers, simple mastectomies are performed in which only the breast with the lining over the chest muscles is removed.

Patients with cancer that has not spread beyond the nipple and the surrounding area are often treated with breast-conserving surgery or lumpectomy. They usually undergo radiation therapy after the actual procedure to prevent recurrence. A breast-conserving surgery consists in the removal of the nipple, areola and the part of the breast that is affected by cancer.

In most cases, adjuvant treatment is part of the treatment schema. This type of treatment is normally given to patients with cancer to prevent a potential recurrence of the disease. Whether adjuvant therapy is needed depends upon the type of cancer and whether the cancer cells have spread to the lymph nodes. In Paget's disease, the most common type of adjuvant therapy is radiation following breast-conservative surgery.

Adjuvant therapy may also consist of anticancer drugs or hormone therapies. Hormonal therapy reduces the production of hormones within the body, or prevents the hormones from stimulating the cancer cells to grow, and it is commonly used in cases of invasive cancer by means of drugs such as tamoxifen and anastrozole.

Prognosis
The presence of three factors for the prognosis has been suggested, whether there is a palpable mass of the disease, whether lymph nodes are positive and whether there is an underlying malignant cancer.
If there is none of these, the five- and 10-year survival is 85% and 80% respectively, with adjuvant chemotherapy even 95% and 90%.  If there is a palpable mass, it is 32% and 31% respectively, with adjuvant chemotherapy (40% and 35%).

Positive lymph-nodes have been positively associated with a palpable mass and affect the prognosis to be now just 28% survival after 10 years (vs 79% without palpable mass and without affected lymph-nodes). Involvement of the lymph nodes does not directly cause any harm, but is merely an indicator of systemic spread.

Furthermore, patients with an identifiable associated underlying breast tumor have a survival rate of 38-40% at five years and a survival rate of 22-33% at 10 years. The death rate of metastatic breast carcinoma in patients with mammary Paget's disease and underlying cancer is 61.3%, with a 10-year cumulative survival rate of 33%.

Epidemiology
Most patients diagnosed with Paget's disease of the nipple are over age 50, but rare cases have been diagnosed in patients in their 20s. The average age at diagnosis is 62 for women and 69 for men. The disease is rare among both women and men.

History 
The condition is named after Sir James Paget, an English surgeon who first described the condition in 1874.

See also 
 List of cutaneous conditions

References

External links 

 National Cancer Institute fact sheet

Breast cancer
Epidermal nevi, neoplasms, and cysts
Diseases named for discoverer